Ralph Archer was an American football coach. He served as the head football coach at Fort Hays State University in Hays, Kansas and he held that position for the 1920 season. His career coaching record at Fort Hays was 2–5–1.

References

Year of birth missing
Year of death missing
Fort Hays State Tigers football coaches